Venkat Chandrasekaran is a Professor in the Computing and Mathematical Sciences Department at the California Institute of Technology. He is known for work on mathematical optimization and its application to the information sciences.

Academic biography
Chandrasekaran studied at Rice University, where he completed the BA degree in Mathematics and the BS degree in Electrical and Computer Engineering in 2005.  He then received a PhD degree Electrical Engineering and Computer Science from the Massachusetts Institute of Technology in 2011. He was a postdoctoral researcher at the University of California, Berkeley for one year before joining Caltech as an Assistant Professor in 2012.

Research and honors

Chandrasekaran's research focuses on mathematical optimization and, specifically, developing an understanding of the power and limitations of convex optimization.  His thesis work studied convex optimization in the context of questions related to statistical modeling, and received the Jin-Au Kong Outstanding Doctoral Thesis Prize for the best PhD thesis in electrical engineering at MIT.  Additionally, he received the Young Researcher Prize in Continuous Optimization for his work on matrix decomposition.

References

External links
 Venkat Chandrasekaran professional home page

Living people
California Institute of Technology faculty
Rice University alumni
20th-century American mathematicians
Year of birth missing (living people)
Massachusetts Institute of Technology alumni
21st-century American mathematicians